Linthicum is a surname. Notable people with the surname include:

 Hezekiah Linthicum Bateman (1812-1875), American actor and manager
 John Charles Linthicum (1867-1932), Maryland politician
 J. F. Linthicum, editor of Occidental and Vanguard
Lotta Linthicum (1870s-1952) American actress
 Clayton Linthicum, Canadian guitarist and singer in Saskatchewan psych-folk-roots duo Kacy & Clayton.